Terror from the Stars is a 1986 role-playing game adventure for Call of Cthulhu published by Chaosium.

Plot summary
Terror from the Stars contains two adventure scenarios involving mysterious South American temples connected to the Cthulhu Mythos.

Reception
Phil Frances reviewed Terror from the Stars for White Dwarf #79, and stated that "Terror From The Stars stands up well against other releases of its type (The Asylum, or Curse of the Chthonians for example), and the added advantage of a lower price means you can't really go wrong with this one."

Lisa Cohen reviewed Terror from the Stars in Space Gamer/Fantasy Gamer No. 77. Cohen commented that "The whole package is ideal, especially with the manual it makes it well worth the price. I would recommend this module to avid Cthulhu players. Remember, when playing the scenarios, have a happy voyage and don't drink the water!"

Reviews
 Casus Belli #39 (Aug 1987)

References

Call of Cthulhu (role-playing game) adventures
Role-playing game supplements introduced in 1986